Walter James Sheridan (20 November 1925 - 13 January 1995) was an investigator for various agencies of the US government. He is best known for his role in the prosecution of Jimmy Hoffa, on which subject he published a book in 1972.

Background
Sheridan was born in 1925 in Utica, New York. During World War II, he served in the US Navy's Submarine Service, and according to some sources worked for the Office of Naval Intelligence. After the war he benefited from the G.I. Bill, graduating from Fordham University in 1950.

Career
Sheridan joined the Federal Bureau of Investigation, resigning after four years over J. Edgar Hoover's focus on anti-Communism. As Sheridan later put it, "Hoover was more interested in guys who were Communists for 15 minutes in 1931 than he was in guys who were stealing New Jersey." He was then a National Security Agency investigator for three years.

Sheridan was an investigator for the United States Senate Select Committee on Improper Activities in Labor and Management, recruited to its staff by Robert F. Kennedy in 1957. He was a regional coordinator for John F. Kennedy's 1960 presidential campaign, and a coordinator for the Robert F. Kennedy presidential campaign, 1968. After Robert Kennedy was appointed Attorney General in 1961, Sheridan became a special assistant to Kennedy working as the effective chief of a team investigating Hoffa and the Teamsters. From 1965 to 1970, he was an NBC News special correspondent, producing documentaries on crime and gun control among other issues; his unit received a Peabody Award for work on the 1967 Detroit riot. Sheridan also covered the 1967 prosecution of Clay Shaw by Jim Garrison, and in 1967 produced an hour-long special for NBC on the assassination of John F. Kennedy.

In the 1970s and 80s, he was a principal aide to the United States Senate Committee on the Judiciary and the U.S. Senate Labor and Human Resources Committee.

In fiction
Sheridan is among those portrayed in the film Thirteen Days, which is about the 1962 Cuban Missile Crisis.

In Movies
Sheridan is mentioned in the documentary The JFK Assassination: The Jim Garrison Tapes (1992) pertaining to his work on the 1967 NBC hour-long special about the  assassination of John F. Kennedy.

Books
 The Fall and Rise of Jimmy Hoffa, Saturday Review Press, 1972.

References

1925 births
1995 deaths
Federal Bureau of Investigation agents
NBC News people
People from Utica, New York
Fordham University alumni